António Feliciano (19 January 1922 in Covilhã – 14 December 2010 in Ourense, Spain) former Portuguese footballer who played for Belenenses, as a defender.

International career 

Feliciano made his debut for  Portugal against Spain 6 May 1945 in A Coruña, in a 2-4 defeat. Feliciano gained 14 caps.

External links 
 belenensesilustrado.blogspot.pt
 
 Belenenses.Blogspot 
 
 Pfutebol 

1922 births
People from Covilhã
C.F. Os Belenenses players
Portugal international footballers
Portuguese footballers
Primeira Liga players
2010 deaths
Association football defenders
Sportspeople from Castelo Branco District